Tornagrain (from the Scottish Gaelic Tòrr na Grèine meaning 'The Sunny Mound') is a hamlet and planned village in the Scottish Highlands, situated around  northeast of Inverness. It falls within the Highland council area for local government purposes.

Plans to expand Tornagrain into a community for more than 10,000 residents were submitted to planning authorities by the Moray Estate.  Planning permission was granted for the building of 5,000 homes in September 2012. The development of the site will take place over many years. Developers claim Tornagrain is the first new town to be built in Scotland for more than 50 years.

Transportation 
The hamlet is served by bus. The newly-constructed Inverness Airport railway station is close to Tornagrain.

References

Populated places in Inverness committee area
New towns in Scotland
New towns started in the 2010s